Lee Sung-Min (born 16 May 1986) is a South Korean football player who currently plays for Korea National League side Gangneung City FC.

Club career
On November 20, 2008, Gangwon called Lee up as an extra order from 2009 K-League Draft. His first goal for Gangwon came on April 22, 2009, in a match against Daejeon Citizen during the League Cup group stage.

For the 2010 season, he dropped down to the second tier of South Korean football, joining Korea National League side Gangneung City FC. He proved himself to be a regular starter for his new side.  On 4 January 2011, it was announced that Lee would return to the K-League, joining Daegu FC.

In 2016 season, he has played for the Buriram United in the Toyota Premier Cup with Nagoya Grampus Eight just 45 minutes of play was not good enough. His contract was canceled by that he did not play in the Thai Premier League even once.

Club career statistics

References

External links

1986 births
Living people
South Korean footballers
Gangwon FC players
Gangneung City FC players
Daegu FC players
K League 1 players
Korea National League players
Association football forwards